The Prix Combourg-Chateaubriand is a French literary award created in 1998 by Hervé Louboutin and Sonia de La Tour du Pin. It is awarded by the Académie Chateaubriand, under the presidency of Philippe de Saint Robert since 1999, in memory of the writer François-René de Chateaubriand. The award ceremony takes place at the Château de Combourg in Ille-et-Vilaine, where Chateaubriand lived during a part of his youth.

Laureates
 1998: Philippe de Saint Robert for Le Secret des jours
 1999: Philippe Barthelet for Saint Bernard
 2000: Gérard Leclerc for L'Amour en morceaux ?
 2001: Jean d'Ormesson for Voyez comme on danse
 2003: Régis Debray for God: An Itinerary (Dieu : un itinéraire)
 2004: Marc Fumaroli for Chateaubriand, poésie et terreur
 2005: Jean-Christian Petitfils for Louis XVI
 2006: Francis Huré for Portraits de Pechkoff
 2007: Jean-Maurice de Montremy for Rancé, le soleil noir
 2008: Jean Raspail for his entire oeuvre
 2009: Michel David-Weill for L'esprit en fête
 2010: Marguerite Castillon du Perron for Montalembert et l'Europe de son temps
 2011: Christophe Barbier for Les Derniers Jours de François Mitterrand
 2012: Reynald Secher for A French Genocide: The Vendée (Le Génocide franco-français : La Vendée-Vengé)
 2013: Jean-Marie Rouart for Napoléon ou la Destinée
 2014: Alain Finkielkraut for L'Identité malheureuse
 2015: Éric Zemmour for The French Suicide (Le Suicide français)
 2016: François Sureau for Je ne pense plus voyager
 2017: Emmanuel de Waresquiel for Juger la Reine
 2018: Philippe de Villiers for Le Puy du Fou : un rêve d'enfance
 2019: Michel de Grèce for Avec ou sans couronne

Controversy
The Departmental Council of Ille-et-Vilaine sponsors the award with 600 euros annually. When the prize went to essayist Éric Zemmour in 2015, the local Socialist Party leader, Jean-Luc Chenut, protested against the jury's decision and blocked the transaction. Sonia de La Tour du Pin, co-founder of the prize, dismissed Chenut's reaction as "sectarian".

References

External links
 Official website 

Awards established in 1998
French literary awards
Ille-et-Vilaine
1998 establishments in France
François-René de Chateaubriand